Tetracamphilius is a genus of catfishes (order Siluriformes) of the family Amphiliidae. It includes four species.

Tetracamphilius catfishes are small fishes with the largest species growing to 3.9 cm in length.

Species 
There are currently four recognized species in this genus:
 Tetracamphilius angustifrons (Boulenger, 1902)
 Tetracamphilius clandestinus T. R. Roberts, 2003
 Tetracamphilius notatus (Nichols & Griscom, 1917)
 Tetracamphilius pectinatus T. R. Roberts, 2003

References

Amphiliidae
Catfish genera
Taxa named by Tyson R. Roberts
Freshwater fish genera